The Sony Xperia tipo is a mid-range Android smartphone manufactured by Sony Mobile Communications. The device was released globally during August 2012. There is a dual-SIM version of the Xperia tipo available in certain countries known as the Xperia tipo dual.

Availability
The phone was officially announced with the Sony Xperia miro by Sony Mobile Communications on 13 June 2012 and was officially released worldwide during August 2012. The Xperia tipo was available in Classic Black, Classic White, Deep Red and Navy Blue while the Xperia tipo dual was only available in Classic Black and Silver.

Hardware
The device measures 103 by 57 by 13 mm and weighs 99.4 grams. It features a capacitive touchscreen display which measures 3.2 inches with a resolution of 320 x 480 pixels at 180 ppi with multitouch support and is capable of displaying 262,000 colours. The glass of the display is made from plastic. The camera of the device has 3.2 megapixels capable of 4x digital zoom and supports VGA video recording, it does not have a front-facing camera. It has a Qualcomm Snapdragon S1 MSM7225A single-core 800 MHz ARM Cortex-A5 processor with 2.9 GB of internal memory with up to 2.5 GB user-accessible memory and also has an external slot which supports a maximum 32GB external memory on microSD card.

Tipo Dual
Other than having another sim card slot, the Xperia tipo and Xperia tipo dual are the same. However, the Xperia tipo dual is only available in black and silver, rather than black, silver, red and blue. Only one SIM is used at a time; a hardware button on the right hand side of the device is used to switch between them.

Software
The device runs on Android 4.0.4 (ice cream sandwich) operating system and is integrated with Sony's social media service called Timescape. The software also includes Sony's xLOUD audio filter technology for better music experience and it features stereo FM radio with RDS. Similar to the Xperia miro, the phone is capable of 3D and Motion gaming and is also connected to the Sony Entertainment Network, allowing users to access Music & Video Unlimited.

References

External links
Official website

Android (operating system) devices
Mobile phones introduced in 2012
tipo